The 2019 FC Tobol season was the 21st successive season that the club played in the Kazakhstan Premier League, the highest tier of association football in Kazakhstan. Tobol finished the season in 4th position, reached the Semifinals of the Kazakhstan Cup and were knocked out of the Europa League at the first qualifying round.

Season Events
On 31 December 2018, Vladimir Gazzayev was appointed as the club's new manager. Gazzayev resigned as manager on 21 July, after Tobol were eliminated from the 2019–20 UEFA Europa League by Jeunesse Esch. On 22 July, Nurbol Zhumaskaliyev was appointed as Caretaker manager of Tobol.

New Contracts
On 22 November 2018, Tobol signed new two-year contracts with Sultan Busurmanov, Sultan Abilgazy, Nika Kvekveskiri and Jaba Kankava.

On 14 December 2018, Azat Nurgaliev signed a new one-year contract with Tobol, with Samat Zharynbetov signing a new two-year contract on 27 December 2018.

On 13 January 2019, Grigori Sartakov signed a new two-year contract with Tobol, whilst Viktor Dmitrenko and Artūras Žulpa both signed new one-year contracts on 18 January 2019. Aleksandr Zhukov signed a new one-year contract with Tobol on 26 January.

Squad

On loan

Transfers

In

Out

Loans in

Loans out

Released

Trial

Friendlies

Competitions

Premier League

Results summary

Results by round

Results

League table

Kazakhstan Cup

UEFA Europa League

Qualifying rounds

Squad statistics

Appearances and goals

|-
|colspan="14"|Players away from Tobol on loan:

|-
|colspan="14"|Players who left Tobol during the season:

|}

Goal scorers

Disciplinary record

References

External links
Official Website

FC Tobol seasons
Tobol